Matthew Sharpe (born July 24, 1991) is a Canadian triathlete. In 2021, he competed in the men's triathlon at the 2020 Summer Olympics held in Tokyo, Japan.

Career
Sharpe has competed at two Commonwealth Games. In 2014, Sharpe finished 21st in the individual race and fourth in the mixed relay. In 2018, Sharpe finished ninth in the individual and fourth again in the mixed relay.

In July 2021, Sharpe was named to Canada's 2020 Olympic team.

References

External links
ITU Bio

1991 births
Canadian male triathletes
Living people
People from Campbell River, British Columbia
Triathletes at the 2014 Commonwealth Games
Triathletes at the 2018 Commonwealth Games
Commonwealth Games competitors for Canada
Triathletes at the 2020 Summer Olympics
Olympic triathletes of Canada
21st-century Canadian people